Antonio Martorell Sastre (born 8 December 1978) is an S9 swimmer from Spain. He competed at the 1996 Summer Paralympics, where he earned a bronze medal in the 4 x 100 freestyle 34 points relay. He competed at the 2000 Summer Paralympics, where he did not medal.

References

External links 
 
 

1978 births
Living people
Spanish male freestyle swimmers
Paralympic swimmers of Spain
Paralympic bronze medalists for Spain
Paralympic medalists in swimming
Swimmers at the 1996 Summer Paralympics
Swimmers at the 2000 Summer Paralympics
Medalists at the 1996 Summer Paralympics
Sportspeople from Mallorca
S9-classified Paralympic swimmers
People from Inca, Mallorca